Made in Heaven is the fifteenth and final studio album by the British rock band Queen, released on 6 November 1995 by Parlophone Records in the United Kingdom and by Hollywood Records in the United States. It was the band's first and only release solely under the name "Queen" after the death of lead singer Freddie Mercury in 1991. Following Mercury's death, guitarist Brian May, drummer Roger Taylor, and bass guitarist John Deacon worked with vocal and piano parts that Mercury recorded before his death, adding new instrumentation to the recordings. Both stages of recording, before and after Mercury's death, were completed at the band's studio in Montreux, Switzerland. The album debuted at number 1 in the UK, where it went quadruple platinum selling 1.2 million copies. 500,000 copies were shipped in the United States.

Following the album's release, Queen released one single in 1997 and subsequently went inactive until 2004 when May and Taylor reunited and started touring with Bad Company frontman Paul Rodgers and later with Adam Lambert; Deacon retired from music in 1997 and has not taken part in any Queen activity since then.

The cover for the album has two different photos: the CD cover photo was shot at dusk, depicting Irena Sedlecká's Mercury sculpture located at Lake Geneva in Montreux, Switzerland, on the front, with May, Taylor and Deacon gazing at the Alps on the rear cover; meanwhile, the LP cover photo was shot in the same spot at dawn, depicting the same statue on the front but with May, Taylor and Deacon gazing at the sunrise on the rear cover.

Background and recording

The album was recorded in a much different way from Queen's other studio albums. In early 1991, having completed work on Innuendo, and some months before his death, Freddie Mercury recorded as many vocals as he could, with the instruction to the rest of the band (Brian May, Roger Taylor, and John Deacon) to complete the songs later. Put to tape during this time were primarily "A Winter's Tale", "Mother Love" and what would eventually become "You Don't Fool Me".

In the documentary  Champions of the World, May described these sessions with Mercury as such:

Producer David Richards also added:

After Mercury's death, the band returned to the studio in 1993 to begin work finishing the tracks. May has described in interviews that Taylor and Deacon had begun some work in 1992, while May was on tour promoting his Back to the Light album. Upon his return in 1993, May felt they were not on the right path with the music and they more or less started from scratch with the three of them working together with producer David Richards.

With less than an album's worth to work with, the band decided to revisit previously recorded material. The band did not discuss whether Mercury had any input before his death regarding which songs might be considered. The idea was to take existing songs on which Mercury sang and rework them as Queen songs.

In 2013, Brian May said about the album "[Made in Heaven] was possibly the best Queen album we ever made. It has so much beauty in it. It was a long, long process, painstakingly put together. A real labour of love."

Songs

"It's a Beautiful Day"
Years before Mercury started recording solo material, he created a sound clip of himself experimenting on the piano at Musicland Studios in Munich in 1980 during the sessions of The Game. Later, for the use of this album, the song was extended to two minutes and 32 seconds. The more classical section, without Mercury's improvisation, was put together by John Deacon. Near the end, a short orchestral sample from the coda of 'La Calinda' by English composer Frederick Delius can clearly be heard.

"Made in Heaven"

Originally from Mercury's Mr. Bad Guy, this song, along with the other Mercury solo track "I Was Born to Love You", was reworked to a "Queen sound" and Mercury's original vocals were placed over the new music. In an interview with Far Out, May called the song one of his favourite Queen tracks."

"Let Me Live"

"Let Me Live" is a rock ballad, which features a rare sharing of the vocals between Mercury, May, and Taylor. This track was originally recorded with Rod Stewart during sessions for the 1984 album The Works. Once finished in 1995 for Made in Heaven, Queen made one 11th-hour change to the song to avoid legal action. Part of the backing vocals featured lyrics too closely resembling Erma Franklin's "Piece of My Heart". The potentially problematic bit was mixed out and the track was released. Promo cassettes from the US feature the unaltered backing track. Early Mexican and Dutch CD pressings are reported to have this alternate version as well.

"Mother Love"

"Mother Love" was the final song co-written by Mercury and May, and was also Mercury's last vocal performance. Mercury's vocals for "Mother Love" were recorded 13–16 May 1991. On his website, May discussed the writing process he and Mercury had (writing both separately and together, and conscious of the nature of the song and the lyrics). Upon reaching the final verse, Mercury told May that he had to go and "have a rest", but that he would return later and finish it. Mercury never made it back to the studio due to his worsening condition, thus May sang the last verse on the track.

The song features a sample of the vocal improvisation from Queen's famous 12 July 1986 concert at Wembley Stadium, and a sample from the intro of the studio version of "One Vision" and "Tie Your Mother Down". It also features a sample from a cover of "Goin' Back", a song written by Carole King and Gerry Goffin, for which Mercury had provided lead vocals in 1972. The cover was released as a B-side to "I Can Hear Music", a Ronettes cover, by Larry Lurex (a pseudonym of Mercury's), not long before the release of Queen's debut album. The sound bursts between the sing along and the "Goin' Back" sample are apparently a few milliseconds of every Queen track ever recorded, put together, and then rapidly sped through a tape machine. At the very end of the song, a baby is heard crying. This video is age-restricted on YouTube.

"My Life Has Been Saved"
"My Life Has Been Saved" was started as an acoustic track composed mainly by Deacon in 1987–1988. Producer David Richards helped him out doing the demo and the keyboards, then Mercury sang on it, and later on the entire band recorded it. The Made in Heaven version is different from that of 1989 (which originally featured as the B-side to the single "Scandal"), although it uses the same vocals from Mercury. Deacon plays guitar and keyboards as well as his usual instrument, bass guitar.

"I Was Born to Love You"

"I Was Born to Love You" was originally recorded (piano, vocals, synths) by Mercury on 25 May 1984, for his Mr. Bad Guy album, as a late addition (when told by the record company that the album needed "a single"). May, Taylor and Deacon re-recorded it and added their instruments, turning the song into fast-paced rock, mainly featuring hard rock guitar from May. That track became popular in Japan during 2004 when it was used for the theme song of a television drama named Pride (プライド). This version also contains samples of Mercury's ad-lib vocals from "A Kind of Magic", from the 1986 album of the same name, and from "Living on My Own", from his Mr. Bad Guy album. The music video for this version of the song, also made in 2004, is composed mainly of clips from the Mercury solo video and from Queen: Live at Wembley.

"Heaven for Everyone"

"Heaven for Everyone" is a track Taylor wrote and tried out with Queen in 1987, although according to some sources it was written with Joan Armatrading in mind to sing it. Whether she turned it down or Taylor withdrew the song is unclear, but it was recorded by his other band The Cross. One night Mercury came to visit The Cross at the studio and after some drinks he gave them ideas of how to sing the song and ended up recording the lead vocals for it. Mercury appeared on the UK version of their album Shove It as guest lead vocalist on the song, with Taylor doing backing vocals. The roles were reversed on the single and the American version of Shove It. Mercury's vocals were then used for the Made in Heaven release, with a couple of different lines and May singing backing vocals instead of Taylor, with Richards adding several arrangement ideas. It was released as the leading single two weeks before the album's release, with the song's music video commemorating Mercury, and also containing footage of Georges Méliès seminal 1902 silent film A Trip to the Moon.

"Too Much Love Will Kill You"

"Too Much Love Will Kill You" was composed by May, Frank Musker and Elizabeth Lamers sometime between the sessions for A Kind of Magic and The Miracle. They wrote it in the US and Mercury sang on it. However, there were some problems with the companies representing publishing rights for Musker and Lamers so they could not release the song properly on The Miracle. The song even appears in the original track listing between "I Want It All" and "The Invisible Man", but was deleted. This is the only track on the Made in Heaven album which wasn't reworked by the remaining members of the band during 1993–1995 sessions, as it is the original 1989 mix prepared for The Miracle.

At The Freddie Mercury Tribute Concert, May played the song on piano and sang it for the first time in public and then released it as part of his solo album Back to the Light. Its arrangement differs to the Queen version, featuring acoustic guitar solo and no drums. However May played this track live with his touring band in 1992–1993 using an arrangement similar to the original Queen version. The song was awarded Best Song Musically and Lyrically at the 1997 Novello Awards.

This song was also performed by Queen and Luciano Pavarotti in 2003, with Pavarotti singing the latter parts of the verses in Italian.

"You Don't Fool Me"

"You Don't Fool Me" was one of the last tracks recorded for Made in Heaven. May has explained on his website that producer David Richards more or less created the framework of the song single-handedly, building from bits of lyrics recorded just before Mercury's death. May has said that before Richards' work, there was no song to speak of. However, after Richards edited and mixed the song (including a bit of harmonies recorded for "A Winter's Tale") he presented it to the band. May, Taylor and Deacon then added their instruments and backing vocals and were surprised to end up with a finished song that had begun as nothing. The style of the song is reminiscent of their 1982 album Hot Space, and a comment over that featured on their Greatest Hits III album.

"A Winter's Tale"

"A Winter's Tale" is a ballad written and composed by Mercury at his apartment in Montreux, Switzerland. It is the last complete song Mercury composed on his own (the music for "Mother Love" is by May).
It has been branded as one of few Christmas songs from the band, along with "Thank God It's Christmas".

The vocals were laid down months before Mercury's death and the band completed the backing track sometime after. According to the liner notes in the 2011 release, the band finished the song how they thought Freddie would have wanted it.

"It's a Beautiful Day (Reprise)"
A heavier rock version of "It's a Beautiful Day", that is the same in the beginning but later turns into rock. It contains "Yeah" and samples from "Seven Seas of Rhye".

"Yeah"
"Yeah" is the shortest song on the album and in Queen's song catalogue, lasting only four seconds. It consists solely of Mercury saying the word "yeah", which is taken from the song 'Don't Try Suicide' from the band's 1980 album, The Game. And is also taken from "Action this Day"

"13/Untitled"
Running at 22 minutes and 32 seconds, "13" began as an experiment by Richards with an Ensoniq ASR-10 sampler. He took the opening chords of "It's a Beautiful Day" and made them loop, and then added Mercury's voice saying “are you running?” Freddie laughing and at the very end Freddie saying “fab”, through strange echoes. May and Taylor also added some ideas to the track. This track was previously only available on the CD edition of the album and the aforementioned promo cassettes. This is also the longest track Queen had ever made.

Standard cassettes of the album end with the shortened "It's a Beautiful Day (Reprise)", fading out after Track 12 ("Yeah"), where this untitled track would continue on. Track 13 can be purchased also as part of the full album or as a separate piece from Queen's official online store.

The LP (vinyl) edition of the album has only the first few seconds, which run into the run-off of the groove on the record, which actually means that if a listener has a record player which does not have an automatic stop activated at this point, it will play indefinitely, consisting only of the few seconds looped over constantly.

The album's last listed track (all formats) is track 11: "It's a Beautiful Day (Reprise)". In 2015, upon the re-issuing of Queen's discography on vinyl, Made in Heaven was re-issued as a double disc set with track 13 taking up the entirety of side D. The track was given the name "13" and is listed on the artwork.

Critical reception
Made in Heaven received generally positive reviews from music critics. Critics praised its upbeat nature and quality of music after the death of Mercury.

Q magazine wrote: "Ten new tracks (and one reprise). No filler. No shame. An essential purchase for Queen fans, certainly, but even without its special significance, Made in Heaven is probably a better album than Innuendo and a fitting swan song by one of the most incandescent groups in rock. Made in Heaven is also the last musical will and testament of a star who was never going to be turned into a saint, but whose grandstanding performances were, right to the very end, always marked by reckless enthusiasm and a rare generosity of spirit."

The Sunday Times described the album as "essential listening".

Entertainment Weekly wrote: "It's the perfect theatrical epitaph for a life dedicated to gorgeous artifice."

The Guardian stated: "When a band have the controls permanently set at full-tilt, as Queen did, burn-out is inevitable, for the listener, if not for the band. When we eventually reach the drum-crashing finale, "It's a Beautiful Day", which kicks in with Mercury's umpteenth randy-rottweiler howl, it feels as if far more than 70 minutes has passed. That's where the aforesaid lyrics save the day. Predominantly written by Mercury, they are effectively farewell notes. He poured out his heart, and his words have a throat-aching poignance. Even the record's opening verse assumes a painful significance."

Jerusalem Post wrote: "Somehow Mercury and Queen's ability to make a joyful noise in the face of pain and death makes this a very comforting album to have around in shaky times."

The Times stated: "[There are not] any obviously half-baked, or patched-up numbers. Most, however, are as good as anything that Queen came up with in their later years. How good that is, as always with Queen, is largely a matter of taste. "Mother Love", the last recording that Mercury made, is a song of truly heartfelt pathos. Despite its overdue delivery, Made in Heaven stands up remarkably well as the closing chapter in a spectacular pop odyssey."

AllMusic wrote: "Made in Heaven harked back to Queen's 1970s heyday with its strong melodies and hard rock guitar playing, topped by Mercury's bravura singing and some of the massed choir effects familiar from "Bohemian Rhapsody". Even if one did not know that these songs were sung in the shadow of death, that subject would be obvious. The lyrics were imbued with life-and-death issues, from the titles. The odd thing about this was that Mercury's over-the-top singing had always contained a hint of camp humour, and it continued to here, even when the sentiments clearly were as heartfelt as they were theatrically overstated. Maybe Mercury was determined to go out the same way he had come in, as a diva. If so, he succeeded."

Legacy

Popular culture
The album inspired the makers of the Resident Evil series of video games to have certain characters in the game, such as Claire Redfield and Chris Redfield, wear jackets with the words 'Made in Heaven' written on the back. There's also a character named Billy Coen who has a tattoo which says 'Mother Love', another song from the album.

It was also the name of Enrico Pucci's final Stand in JoJo's Bizarre Adventure Part 6: Stone Ocean.

Track listing
The writers of tracks credited to Queen are listed in parentheses. All lead vocals by Freddie Mercury except where noted.

CD

1995 LP
Two tracks on the vinyl version of Made in Heaven had to be edited to fit on one vinyl disc. These two tracks are "I Was Born to Love You" and "You Don't Fool Me". Also, the version of "Heaven for Everyone" included on the vinyl version is the single version.

2015 LP
Made in Heaven was reissued on vinyl on 25 September 2015, alongside all of Queen's other studio albums. This is the first time that the complete album was released on vinyl, spread across 2 LPs. Track 13 is also presented on vinyl for the first time, listed as "13" on the artwork, and taking up all of side four.

Personnel
Track numbering refers to CD and digital releases of the album.

Queen
Freddie Mercury – lead vocals , keyboards , backing vocals , drum machine 
Brian May – electric guitar , backing vocals , keyboards , lead vocals 
Roger Taylor – drums, backing vocals , percussion , keyboards , lead vocals 
John Deacon – bass guitar , keyboards , electric guitar 

Additional personnel
Rebecca Leigh-White, Gary Martin, Catherine Porter, Miriam Stockley – backing vocals 
David Richards – keyboards , co-production, engineering, mixing supervision
Justin Shirley-Smith – co-production, engineering
Josh Macrae – co-production, engineering
Ashley Alexander - engineering
Reinhold Mack – recording of additional material in the '80s
Kevin Metcalfe – mastering
Richard Gray – artwork, cover photograph of Irena Sedlecká's Mercury sculpture in Montreux

Charts

Weekly charts

Year-end charts

Certifications and sales

See also
List of best-selling albums in Germany

References

External links
Queen official website: Discography: Made in Heaven: includes lyrics of all non-bonus tracks except "Yeah", "[Untitled Hidden Track]".

1995 albums
Albums published posthumously
Hollywood Records albums
Parlophone albums
Queen (band) albums